Choi Sang-Hyun  (born 18 March 1984) is a South Korean former football defender, currently manager of Cheongju FC.

External links

1984 births
Living people
Association football defenders
South Korean footballers
Daegu FC players
K League 1 players